Rowing has featured as a sport at the Youth Olympic Summer Games since its first edition in 2010. The Youth Olympic Games are multi-sport event and the games are held every four years just like the Olympic Games. Summer Youth Olympics racing is held over a 1000m course as opposed to the 2000m course used at the Olympics.

Summary

Medal table
As of the 2018 Summer Youth Olympics.

Participating nations

Medalists

2010 Youth Olympic Games Events

2014 Youth Olympic Games Events

2018 Youth Olympic Games Events

See also
Rowing at the Summer Olympics

References

External links
Youth Olympic Games

 
Sports at the Summer Youth Olympics
Youth Olympics